Junior Durward Morsch (December 18, 1920 – August 2, 2015) was an American composer, prolific arranger, trombonist, and retired music educator who has worked and recorded professionally in a broad spectrum of genres, beginning with progressive big band jazz in the late 1940s and ending as a high school band director in Colorado.  He was also the band director at Saguaro High School, in Scottsdale, Arizona.

Career 
Morsch was born in Iowa. Noted for his scoring for symphonic band works, Morsch has written over 400 arrangements, including 125 marching band scores, 110 symphonic scores, and 125 scores for film, dating from the 1930s to the present.

His son, Robert Stuart Morsch, DMA (1942–2009), was a music educator at the collegiate level, notably the director of bands at Western Illinois University.

Between 1946 and 1949, Morsch recorded on five studio sessions and two live broadcast as trombonist with the Earle Spencer Orchestra.  Morsch is an alumnus of the University of Southern California and the University of Northern Colorado (1950s). He died in 2015 at the age of 94 in Colorado Springs.

Selected arrangements and compositions 
 Arrangements

 Songs of a Wayfarer, by Mahler
 Arranged for concert band by Morsch (1950)

 "Twelve clarinet quartets"
 Theodore Presser Company (1963)
 

 "Circus Maximus," by Ottorino Respighi
 Arranged for concert band by Morsch

 "The Day the Earth Stood Still," by Bernard Herrmann
 Arranged for concert band by Morsch

 Overture to "Silverado," by Bruce Broughton
 Arranged for wind symphony by Morsch

 "The Decline and Fall of a Bridge," by John Dankworth
 Arranged for wind symphony by Morsch

 "Little Bach Suites No. 1 & 2"
 Arranged for 3 instruments (woodwind, strings, recorders, or mixed)
 Theodore Presser Company (1964)

 "Contredanse," K. 510,  C 13.02
 "Minuet," K. 599, No. 1
 By Mozart 	
 Universal Music Group
 Trio for flute, B♭ clarinet, and bassoon (or strings or recorders or mixed)
 Theodore Presser Company (1964), Universal edition

 "Consolation No. 4," by Franz Liszt
 For 3 B♭ clarinets, E♭ alto clarinet, B♭ bass clarinet, EE♭ contrabass clarinet, and BB♭ contrabass clarinet
 

 "Section studies for flutes: auxiliary fingering, ear training and intonation, tone quality, blend and balance, technique"
 By Nilo W. Hovey & Morsch	
 Belwin-Mills (1968)
 

 "Little Handel suite"
 Arranged for 3 instruments (woodwind, strings, recorders, or mixed)
 Theodore Presser Company (1964)
 , 

 "Erie Canal," by Gail Kubik
 Arranged for wind symphony by Morsch

 "Concerto for Flute and Strings," by Jerome Moross
 Arranged for wind ensemble by Morsch (2000)

 "Overture to the 7th Voyage of Sinbad," by Bernard Herrmann
 Transcribed by Morsch

 "Passacaglia," by Christopher Palmer
 Arranged for concert band by Morsch

 "Poem," by Griffes
 Flute solo arranged by Morsch for wind ensemble

 Compositions

 "A Christmas Suite For Chamber Winds"
 "Fortinbras March"
 "Nuages"
 "Pantomime of the Actors"
 "Sinfonia," for Chamber Woodwind Ensemble
 "Yagi Bushi"

Professional affiliations 
 Kappa Kappa Psi

Notes and references

Notes

Inline citations

External links 
 Short biography on J.D. Morsch at Really Good Music, LLC, Eau Claire, Wisconsin

American male composers
American composers
American music arrangers
1920 births
2015 deaths
Earle Spencer Orchestra members
University of Southern California alumni
University of Northern Colorado alumni